Julius Ševčík (born 28 October 1978, in Prague) is a Czech director and screenwriter.

His 2016 film A Prominent Patient won twelve Czech Lions. Ševčík studied directing at Film and TV School of the Academy of Performing Arts in Prague and New York Film Academy. In 2013 he was attached to direct Christopher Nolan's script The Keys to the Street, adapted from Ruth Rendell's novel.

Filmography

External links
 
 https://mubi.com/cast/julius-sevcik

References

1978 births
Czech screenwriters
Film directors from Prague
Living people
Czech film directors
21st-century screenwriters
Male screenwriters
21st-century Czech writers
21st-century male writers